Microcephaly albinism digital anomalies syndrome is a very rare congenital genetic disease. The syndrome includes microcephaly, micrognathia, oculocutaneous albinism, hypoplasia of the distal phalanx of fingers, and agenesia of the distal end of the right big toe.


Symptoms and signs
Microcephaly albinism digital anomalies syndrome's symptoms may vary from individual to individual, however there are many common symptoms, associated with this rare genetic disease. Common symptoms are:
 microcephaly
 oculocutaneous albinism
 Slow development of the fingers
 hypoplasia of the distal phalanx of fingers
 tyrosinase‐positive oculocutaneous albinism
 Recurrent bacterial infections
 granulocytopenia
 intermittent thrombopenia
 protruding midface/dysmorphism
 rough and projecting hair
 mild mental retardation

Genetics
In males, duplication of a portion of Xq chromosome is associated with multiple congenital anomalies and developmental delay. Most females recognized as having dup(Xq) chromosomes are phenotypically apparently normal relatives of phenotypically abnormal males. The disease also is associated with the inactivation of the duplicated X chromosomes.

Diagnosis

References 

Chromosomal abnormalities
Genetic diseases and disorders
Rare genetic syndromes
Syndromes with intellectual disability
Rare diseases
Syndromes affecting the nervous system
Syndromes affecting the jaw